Richard Francis "Scooter" Barry IV (born August 13, 1966) is a retired American professional basketball player.

His nickname "Scooter" was given shortly after being born in San Francisco, California. The son of NBA Hall of Fame member Rick Barry, he has three younger brothers Jon, Brent and Drew, who also share his profession. The basketball Barry family shares an NCAA Championship, an NBA Slam Dunk Championship and three NBA Championship titles between them. He has a half brother, Canyon Barry, who played at the College of Charleston (then Florida as a graduate transfer) and whose mother, Lynn Barry, was also a distinguished basketball player at William & Mary.

Barry played college basketball at Kansas and was a junior on the 1987–88 Jayhawks team that won the NCAA title. He played a vital part in the team's championship run, scoring a career-high 15 points in the Jayhawks' 71–58 win over Kansas State, sending them to the Final Four. He went on to play 17 years professionally in the United States and overseas in Germany, Spain, Italy, France, Belgium and Australia. He won a CBA title in 1995, a Belgian League title in 2004 and reached the NBL finals in 1995.

Barry has two children from a previous marriage, Lauren (2003) and Grant (2006). As of March 2020, he is married to Ruby Palmore, and they live in the Bay Area.

References

1966 births
Living people
American expatriate basketball people in Belgium
American expatriate basketball people in France
American expatriate basketball people in Germany
American expatriate basketball people in Italy
American expatriate basketball people in Spain
American men's basketball players
American people of Lithuanian descent
Baloncesto León players
Basketball Löwen Braunschweig players
Basketball players from San Francisco
Cholet Basket players
Fort Wayne Fury players
Giessen 46ers players
Guards (basketball)
Kansas Jayhawks men's basketball players
Liga ACB players
San Jose Jammers players
Saski Baskonia players
Spirou Charleroi players
Wichita Falls Texans players